QE may stand for:

Economics 
 Quantitative easing, a monetary policy intended to stimulate an economy in recession
 Quantum economics, a type of monetary economic analysis

Education 
 Qualifying examination, an exam required to continue studies at a higher level
 Queen Elizabeth School (disambiguation), several schools, including:
 Queen Elizabeth's School, Wimborne Minster, in Winborne Minster, Dorset, England
 Queen Elizabeth Sixth Form College, in Darlington, County Durham, England
 Wyggeston and Queen Elizabeth I College in Leicester, England

Hospitals
 Queen Elizabeth Hospital Birmingham in England
 Queen Elizabeth Hospital, Hong Kong, a hospital at King's Park in Kowloon, Hong Kong
 Queen Elizabeth Hospital, Adelaide, in Australia

Mathematics 
 Quantifier elimination, a technique to simplify formulas
 Quadratic equation, an equation involving the second power (square) but no higher

Royalty 
 Queen of England (disambiguation)
 Queen Elizabeth (disambiguation), several queens, including:
 Queen Elizabeth I of England (1533–1603)
 Queen Elizabeth II of the United Kingdom (born 1926)

Science and engineering 
 Quantum efficiency, a measure of a device's sensitivity to light
 Quantum entanglement, a close interaction between particles at the quantum level such that they are inseparable
 Quality assurance, also known as quality engineering
 Quality Engineering (journal), an academic journal focused on quality assurance
 Query expansion, a technique to provide better search results by automatically adding similar searches
 Quartz Compositor, also known as Quartz Extreme, the windowing system in Mac OS X

Transportation 
 Queen Elizabeth Way, a highway in Ontario, Canada
 Queen Elizabeth-class aircraft carrier, a class Royal Navy ships
 Crossair Europe (IATA airline designator QE)
 Queen Elizabeth (ship)

Culture 
 Queer Eye (2003 TV series)

See also 
 QE1 (disambiguation)
 QE2 (disambiguation)
 QE3 (disambiguation)